Kanakkarapola is a village in Sri Lanka. It is located within Central Province in Sri Lanka about 51 mi (or 83 km) north-east of Colombo, the country's capital city.  Some points of interest include Hatharaliyadda National School, Hatharaliyadda Divisional Hospital, and a Buddhist Temple nearby.

See also
List of towns in Central Province, Sri Lanka

External links

Populated places in Kandy District